The 2017 CONCACAF Under-20 Championship was the 5th edition of the CONCACAF Under-20 Championship (26th edition if all eras included), the men's under-20 international football tournament organized by CONCACAF. It was hosted in Costa Rica between 17 February and 5 March 2017.

The competition determined the four CONCACAF representatives at the 2017 FIFA U-20 World Cup in South Korea. The United States, Mexico, Honduras, and Costa Rica qualified.

The tournament also determined which two Caribbean nations participate in the 2018 Central American and Caribbean Games.

Qualification

Notes

Venues

Draw
The draw took place on November 29, 2016 at 18:00 CST (UTC−6) at El Cubo, Estadio Nacional, San José, Costa Rica, and was streamed live via CONCACAF.com.

Different from previous tournaments, the 12 teams were drawn into three groups of four teams in the group stage. Costa Rica, Mexico and the United States were seeded into each of the three groups.
Mexico, as champions of the 2015 CONCACAF U-20 Championship, were seeded in position A1.
United States, as the best-ranked CONCACAF team in the 2015 FIFA U-20 World Cup, were seeded in position B1.
Costa Rica, as hosts, were seeded in position C1.

The remaining nine teams were allocated to pots 2–4 designed to ensure balanced and competitive groups weighted equally by region. They were drawn in order and placed in the group position drawn from Pots A, B and C.

The top two teams from each group in the group stage advance to the classification stage, where the six teams are drawn into two groups of three teams. The positions of each group winner and runner-up from the group stage were then drawn in group pairs, randomly into the two groups (D and E) for the classification stage.

The top two teams from each group in the classification stage qualify for the 2017 FIFA U-20 World Cup, with the group winners also advancing to the final to decide the champions of the CONCACAF U-20 Championship.

Squads

Each squad can contain 20 players (including two goalkeepers).

Group stage
The top two teams from each group in the group stage advance to the classification stage.

Tiebreakers (for both group stage and classification stage)
The teams are ranked according to points (3 points for a win, 1 point for a draw, 0 points for a loss). If tied on points, tiebreakers are applied in the following order:
 Greater number of points in matches between the tied teams;
 Greater goal difference in matches between the tied teams (if more than two teams finish equal on points);
 Greater number of goals scored in matches among the tied teams (if more than two teams finish equal in points);
 Greater goal difference in all group matches;
 Greater number of goals scored in all group matches;
 Drawing of lots.

All times are local, CST (UTC−6).

Group A

Group B

Group C

Classification stage
The top two teams from each group in the classification stage qualify for the 2017 FIFA U-20 World Cup, with the group winners also advancing to the final to decide the champions of the CONCACAF U-20 Championship.

Group D

Group E

Final
Since the final ended in a tie at the end of 90 minutes, no extra time was played and the match was decided by a penalty shoot-out.

Awards

Winners

Individual awards
The following awards were given at the conclusion of the tournament.
Golden Ball
 Erik Palmer-Brown

Golden Boot
 Ronaldo Cisneros (6 goals)

Golden Glove
 Jonathan Klinsmann

Fair Play Award

Best XI
Goalkeeper:  Jonathan Klinsmann
Right Defender:  Marlon Fossey
Central Defender:  Edson Álvarez
Central Defender:  Justen Glad
Left Defender:  Andrés Andrade
Right Midfielder:  Uriel Antuna
Central Midfielder:  Jorge Álvarez
Central Midfielder:  Erik Palmer-Brown
Left Midfielder:  Brooks Lennon
Attacking Midfielder:  Randall Leal
Forward:  Ronaldo Cisneros

Goalscorers
6 goals

 Ronaldo Cisneros

4 goals

 Ricardo Ávila
 Brooks Lennon

3 goals

 Randall Leal
 Jorge Daniel Álvarez
 Uriel Antuna
 Leandro Ávila

2 goals

 Oneko Lowe
 Fernando Castillo
 Roberto Domínguez
 Jonel Désiré
 Darixon Vuelto
 Eduardo Aguirre
 Kathon St. Hillaire
 Sebastian Saucedo

1 goal

 Luther Wildin
 Mazhye Burchall
 Shaan Hundal
 Kris Twardek
 Andy Reyes
 Josè Contreras
 Marvin Márquez
 Josue Rivera
 Alessandro Campoy
 Brian Chevreuil
 Ronaldo Damus
 Kenley Dede
 Jimmy-Shammar Sanon
 Foslyn Grant
 Denil Maldonado
 Douglas Martínez
 Sebastián Córdova
 Claudio Zamudio
 Andrés Andrade
 Isidoro Hinestroza
 Romario Martin
 Javier Sutton
 Jabari Mitchell
 Luca de la Torre
 Jonathan Lewis
 Erik Palmer-Brown
 Emmanuel Sabbi
 Eryk Williamson

1 own goal

 Vashami Allen (playing against Mexico)
 Jarmarlie Stevens (playing against Honduras)
 Tehvan Tyrell (playing against Costa Rica)
 Walter Ayala (playing against Mexico)

Qualification for international tournaments

Qualified teams for FIFA U-20 World Cup
The following four teams from CONCACAF qualified for the 2017 FIFA U-20 World Cup.

1 Bold indicates champion for that year. Italic indicates host for that year.

Qualified teams for Central American and Caribbean Games
The competition was used to decide the two teams from the Caribbean Football Union which would qualify for the 2018 Central American and Caribbean Games. As none of the five Caribbean teams reached the classification stage, all teams were ranked by their group stage performance.

References

External links
Under 20s – Men, CONCACAF.com

 
2017
U-20 Championship
International association football competitions hosted by Costa Rica
2017 in youth association football
2016–17 in Costa Rican football
February 2017 sports events in North America
March 2017 sports events in North America